The 2005–06 Eastern Counties Football League season was the 64th in the history of Eastern Counties Football League a football competition in England.

Premier Division

The Premier Division featured 19 clubs which competed in the division last season, along with three new clubs, promoted from Division One:
Ipswich Wanderers
Kirkley
Needham Market

League table

Division One

Division One featured 17 clubs which competed in the division last season, along with five new clubs:
Debenham LC, joined from the Suffolk and Ipswich League
Fulbourn Institute, joined from the Cambridgeshire League
Gorleston, relegated from the Premier Division
Great Yarmouth Town, relegated from the Premier Division
Stowmarket Town, relegated from the Premier Division

League table

References

External links
 Eastern Counties Football League

2005-06
9